Play Dirty is a 1969 British war film starring Michael Caine, Nigel Davenport, Nigel Green and Harry Andrews. It was director Andre DeToth's last film, based on a screenplay by Melvyn Bragg and Lotte Colin.

The film's story is inspired by the exploits of units such as the Long Range Desert Group, Popski's Private Army and the SAS in North Africa during the Second World War.

Plot
During the North African Campaign in the Second World War, Captain Douglas is a British Petroleum employee seconded to the Royal Engineers to oversee incoming fuel supplies for the British Eighth Army. Colonel Masters commands a special raiding unit composed of convicted criminals, and after a string of failures he is told by his commander, Brigadier Blore, that he must have a regular officer to lead a dangerous last-chance mission to destroy an Afrika Korps fuel depot, otherwise his unit will be disbanded. Despite Douglas's objections, he is chosen for his knowledge of oil pipelines and infrastructure. Douglas is then introduced to Cyril Leech, a convicted criminal rescued from prison to lead Masters' operations in the field.

The next day, Douglas and Leech are provided with armed jeeps and lead six other men out into the desert disguised as an Italian Army patrol. They endure a long and arduous trek across the desert: encountering hostile tribesmen, sandstorms and a booby-trapped oasis, among other dangers. Unknown to Masters, Blore has sent a regular army raiding party overloaded in wheeled trucks with the same objective 2 days behind Masters, but they are wiped out in a tracked vehicle German ambush. While Leech and his men are often insubordinate towards Douglas's command. One of the gay couple gets severely injured by a landmine while stealing watches off soldiers' corpses during a stop for supplies. Douglas captures a German ambulance in which they discover a German nurse, who is forced to tend to the injured man.  The men eventually try to rape the nurse but are prevented from doing so. Finally, they reach their objective, only to discover that the depot is fake. After taking shelter, Leech admits to Douglas that he is being kept alive only because Masters is paying him £2000 for his safe return. Douglas insists that the men continue their search for the fuel depot, but the men laugh in his face. 

The group then follows Leech's lead and heads to a German-occupied port city, hoping to steal a boat and escape; Douglas sees the fuel depot there and convinces Leech that destroying it would aid their plan. Meanwhile, Masters is confronted by Blore with aerial photographs of the supposed depot intact — confirming the mission's failure. Having lost contact with the men for some time, Masters is ordered to leak intelligence on the team to the Germans; the British Army is now on the offensive, and it wishes to keep any enemy fuel depots intact for capture.

Under the cover of night, the men don German uniforms and sneak into the port depot to plant their explosives, but one of them sets off a trip flare and they are quickly surrounded; an officer on a loudspeaker calls each of them out by name, revealing Masters' betrayal. The men scatter as the depot is detonated; Leech and Douglas manage to slip away, while the rest are discovered and killed one by one. Back in the ambulance, while waiting for the rest of the men to return, the injured team member, on his deathbed, uses his last strength to murder the German nurse bound and gagged beside him.

The Eighth Army arrives the next morning; Douglas and Leech (still wearing their German uniforms) decide to surrender to the British. Unfortunately, a trigger-happy British soldier opens fire, killing them before noticing their white flag of surrender. The soldier is chastised momentarily by his superior before the troops move on.

Cast

 Michael Caine as Captain Douglas, Royal Engineers
 Nigel Davenport as Captain Cyril Leech
 Nigel Green as Lieutenant Colonel Masters
 Harry Andrews as Brigadier Blore
 Patrick Jordan as Major Alan Watkins, Guards Commando Unit
 Daniel Pilon as Captain Attwood, Blore's Adjutant
 Bernard Archard as Colonel Homerton  
 Aly Ben Ayed as Sadok
 Takis Emmanouel as Kostas Manou
 Vivian Pickles as a German Nurse
 Stanley Caine as German Officer, Stanley is the younger brother of Michael Caine.
 Martin Burland as Dead Officer
 George McKeenan as Corporal At Quayside
 Bridget Espeet as Ann
 Enrique Avila as Kalarides
 Mohsen Ben Abdallah as Hassan
 Mohamed Kouka as Assine
 Scott Miller as Boudesh
 Michael Stevens as Captain Johnson
 Tony Stamboulieh as Barman In Arab Bar
 Jose Halufi as Arab
 Jeremy Child as 2nd Lieutenant
 Dennis Brennan as Corporal
 Rafael Albaicín as Chief Arab At Oasis

Production

Development
The film was originally titled Written in the Sand; it was announced in October 1967 with Michael Caine to star and René Clément to direct. Caine later said he made the film because of his relationship with producer Harry Saltzman and the fact he wanted to work with Clément.

The film was also known as Deadly Patrol.

In February 1968 Richard Harris and Nigel Davenport signed to co-star, by which time the film had been re-named Play Dirty. However Richard Harris ultimately did not appear in the film.

According to Andre DeToth, Lotte Colin did hardly any of the screenplay despite being credited. She was Saltzman's mother-in-law.

Filming
The film was originally planned by Saltzman to be filmed in Israel. Saltzman asked Andre DeToth to scout the country for locations. De Toth said Clément wanted to film in Morocco or Algeria, but Saltzman refused to go to North Africa, and Clément refused to go to Israel. The film ended up being shot on location in the Tabernas Desert near Tabernas in Almería, Spain.

Richard Harris left his home in London for Spain on 16 February 1968. He said he was handed a script which was different from the one he had agreed to do when he signed on. He quit the film and sued the producers for payment of his salary, which was a reported £150,000.

After Nigel Davenport replaced Harris, and Nigel Green replaced Davenport, René Clément resigned as director, and executive producer André DeToth took over directing the film. DeToth said Clément "wanted to make a 'poetry of war'" while Saltzman "wanted blazing guns and roaring tanks".

Several other films were shooting in Almería at the same time, including Shalako. Caine later said, "There are six sand dunes in Almeria... We'd all come round the hill chasing Rommel's tanks - and there's horse shit all over the desert and a stagecoach in the other directions being chased by Indians. The other film units were forever wiping out tank tracks to get their westerns and we were forever shovelling up horse shit and wiping out hoof prints to get our El Alamein." Caine later said he had a clause in his contracts that any film on which he worked could not be made in Almería. "It was that bad".

DeToth later said that in making the film, "I wanted to rub our noses in the mess we have created and how we shy away from our ability to clean it up... I wanted to disturb, to open closed eyes and scramble brains."

Reception
The film was a box office disappointment.

References

External links
 
 
 
 
 Play Dirty Movie Locations 

1969 films
British war adventure films
North African campaign films
1960s war adventure films
Anti-war films about World War II
Films scored by Michel Legrand
Films directed by Andre DeToth
Films produced by Harry Saltzman
United Artists films
Films shot in Almería
British World War II films
1960s English-language films
1960s British films